Coconut is the third full-length album by London-based band Archie Bronson Outfit and was released on 1 March 2010.

"Shark's Tooth" was the first single from the album and was released on 22 February 2010. Initial copies of Coconut featured an accompanying DVD of videos for each track on the album.

Track listing
 "Magnetic Warrior"
 "Shark's Tooth"
 "Hoola"
 "Wild Strawberries"
 "Chunk"
 "You Have A Right to a Mountain Life / One Up on Yourself"
 "Bite It & Believe It"
 "Hunt You Down"
 "Harness (Bliss)"
 "Run Gospel Singer"

Singles
"Shark's Tooth" (22 February 2010, Domino Records)
"Hoola" (28 June 2010, Domino Records)
"Chunk" (19 October 2010, Domino Records)

References

External links

2010 albums
Archie Bronson Outfit albums
Domino Recording Company albums